João Sousa was the defending champion, but lost to Benjamin Becker in the first round.
Kei Nishikori won the title, defeating Julien Benneteau in the final, 7–6(7–4), 6–4.

Seeds
The top four seeds receive a bye into the second round.

Draw

Finals

Top half

Bottom half

Qualifying

Seeds

Qualifiers

Qualifying draw

First qualifier

Second qualifier

Third qualifier

Fourth qualifier

References
 Main Draw
 Qualifying Draw

Proton Malaysian Open
Malaysian Open - Singles